The 1994–95 2. Bundesliga season was the twenty-first season of the 2. Bundesliga, the second tier of the German football league system. This was the last season in which two points were awarded for a win. From the following season onwards the league moved to a three points for a win system.

F.C. Hansa Rostock, FC St. Pauli and Fortuna Düsseldorf were promoted to the Bundesliga while 1. FC Saarbrücken, FC 08 Homburg and FSV Frankfurt were relegated to the Regionalliga.

League table
For the 1994–95 season Fortuna Düsseldorf, FSV Frankfurt and FSV Zwickau were newly promoted to the 2. Bundesliga from the Oberliga while 1. FC Nürnberg, SG Wattenscheid 09 and VfB Leipzig had been relegated to the league from the Bundesliga.

Results

Top scorers
The league's top scorers:

References

External links
 2. Bundesliga 1994/1995 at Weltfussball.de 
 1994–95 2. Bundesliga at kicker.de 

1994-95
2
Germany